Pseudolabrus guentheri, or Gunther's wrasse, is a ray-finned fish from the wrasse family. It was named for Albert Günther.

Habitat
Gunther's wrasse is a marine species which inhabits rocky and coral reefs generally in shallow water up to 20m in depth. The species feeds on small benthic crustaceans.

Distribution
The species is exclusively known from subtropical eastern Australia, occurring in Queensland as far north as Lindeman Island, and in New South Wales as far south as Botany Bay.

Name
The specific name of this fish honours the British-German ichthyologist and herpetologist Albert Günther 1830-1914).

References

guentheri
Fish described in 1862
Fish of Australia
Fish of the Pacific Ocean